Karjule Hareshwar formerly called Karjule Harya is a village in Ahmednagar district of Maharashtra, India. This village is located on Kalyan Ahmednagar highway National Highway 222.  It is located 50 km towards west from District headquarters Ahmednagar. 25 km from Parner. 181 km from State capital Mumbai. It is well known village as Mumbaikar's Village. Most of the family members are working in Mumbai in transportation and many more things. 
 while coming from Mumbai the village border starts with kokate vasti - Hanuman temple and Baban Radhu unde Hotel on kalyan nagar Highway.

Education

Education Society

Vishnu Shinde with help of some people from village established an education society named Shree Hareshwar Education Society in 1978. He was president of society since then till 2010. Currently his son Ramdas Shinde is president of the education society. 
Shivajirao Andhale is current secretary of the society. He has done notable contribution in society's and school's progress.

The society having following schools in Maharashtra State:
 Shree Hareshwar Vidayalaya, Karjule Hareshwar
 Shri Hareshwar Jr. College of Commerce
 Nutan Madhyamik Vidyalaya, Khadakwadi
 Nutan Jr. College of Art and Science
 Madhyamik Vidyalaya, Palashi
 Madhyamik Vidyalaya, Kohkadi
The main office of the society is in Karjule Hareshwar.

Schools
Karjule hareshwar has two schools
 Jilha Parishad Prathamik School
Provides education from 1st standard to 4th standard
 Shree Hareshwar Vidyalaya
Shree Hareshwar Vidyalaya is one of the best schools in Ahmednagar district.
Provides education from 5th standard to 12th standard. Mr. Eknath Date was Head Master of the school for about 28 years. Currently Mr. S.K. Unde is Head master of the school.

College
Rajiv Gandhi College of Engineering.
Approved Running Courses: 
B.E. (Computer)
B.E. (Electrical)
B.E. (E & T)
B.E. (Mechanical)

Hareshwar Gramin Vikas Trust

Hareshwar Ratna Awards 
Hareshwar ratna awards were distributed on 14 April 2014 to those people who have done extraordinary work in their field with ordinary backgrounds, but went on to excel in life. The recipients were 65 in total.

Dr. Waphare Balasaheb Bhagaji (Principal MIT Arts, Science & Commerce College, Alandi, Pune) was awarded for his excellence in field of higher education & research.
Pramod Pandharinath Kokate was awarded for his excellent work in Logistics industry and attaining a top position in his field.
SHRI.RAMDAS SONAJI SHIRKE(CERTIFIED AUDITORS FOR CO OP SOCIETY &MILK DAIRY) WAS AWARDED FOR HIS EXTRAORDINARY WORK IN THAIR CO OPERATIVE FIELD.

Economy
Majority of the population of Karjule Hareshwar do farming for daily living. There are other sources of income such as,

Dairy Farming

Fish Farming

Banks
 Ahmednagar District Central Co-Operative Bank
 Kanhur Pathar Patsanstha
 Anusaya Patsanstha
 Shree Hareshwar Co.Op.Credit So.Ltd. Mumbai

Financial Societes
 Gramin Vikas Society
 Shree Hareshwar Co.Op.Credit So.Ltd. Mumbai.

Religion

The majority of the population in Karjule Hareshwar is Hindu. But also there are few Muslims. There are several temples and a masque in the village. There is Hareshwar Temple in the village.

Temples and Mosques
 Shree Hareshwar Temple (श्री हरेश्वर महाराज मंदिर ,श्री क्षेत्र कर्जुले हरेश्वर)
Shree Hareshwar temple is main temple in the village. Karjule Hareshwar is named after this temple.#हजरत ख्वाँजा मोईनुद्दिन चिश्ती दरगाह  कल्याण-अहमदनगर हायवे ने टाकळी ढोकेश्वर कडे जाताना कर्जुले घाटाच्या उत्तर दिशेला निर्सगरम्य ठिकाण# *Hajrat Khwaja moinuddin Chisti* सर्वधर्म समभाव म्हणजेच हिंदू मुस्लिम एकतेचे प्रतिक.दरवर्षी चैत्र महिना (गुढीपाडवा) ह्या दिवशी बाबांचा "संदल व ऊरूस" मोठ्या भक्ती भावाने साजरा केला जातो.
 Madina Masjid 
 Ganpati Temple
 Hanuman Temple
 Muktadevi Temple
 Mahadev Temple (Khudyatil)
 Kamljamata Temple
 Hanuman Temple Wafare Wadi
 Vitthal Rukmini Temple Wafare Wadi
 Shiv sai Temple Wafare Wadi
 Kamaljamata Temple Mandohal
Shri hanuman Tempal.Sontembhi

Notable people

 Mr. Noormohamed Babulal Pathan (social worker - businessman
 Lat. Tukaram Maharaj Shasriji, Spiritual guru 
 Dr. Narayan Maharaj Jadhav, Spiritual guru
 Lat. Vishnu(shet) Patilbuaa Shinde, social worker - businessman
 Mr. Firoz Babulal Pathan (social worker - businessman
 Mr. Jainuddin Chand Pathan (social worker

Places of interest

The Noori Bhurji Shop

The Noori Shop is a very famous shop in Karjule Harya which is situated 1 km away from the village on the Highway towards the Kalyan. The shop has become the main attraction of the village. Hence, people from other villages are also coming to eat healthy Bhurji Pav, drink organic tea and some other healthy and harmless foods.

Mandohol Dam

Mandohol Dam was constructed on the Mandohol river between 1977 and 1983. The irrigation was started in 1984. The gross storage capacity of this dam is 11.30 Mcum (399 Mcft).

Khwajipir Hill
Khwajipir hill is located at east to village.
"हजरत ख्वाँजा मोईनुद्दिन चिश्ती रहे. कर्जुले हरेश्वर"हिंदू मुस्लिम एकतेचे प्रतीक म्हणून महाराष्ट्रात प्रसिद्ध दरगाह आहे. यात्रा चैत्र शुद्ध गुढीपाडव्याच्या दिवशी भरते.
Hajrat Khwaja Moinuddin Chisty Dargah(Khawaja peer Baba).
Holy place for all religions from Maharashtra

Pachiambe Lake
The lake is located near Peth.

Mothemel Lake
One more lake neate Pachiambe lake

B T PHATA

Transport

Roads
Karjule Hareshwar is well connected to other villages by NH 222. MSRTC buses are primary mode of transportation.

How to Reach
Nearest Railway Station    Ahmednagar (40 km)
Nearest Bus Stand 	    Takali Dhokeshwar (6 km)
Nearest Airport 	    Pune (90 km)

Geographical Location
Karjule Hareshwar village is surrounded by hills. On the east it has Takali Dhokeshwar village, on the south it has Karegaon, on the west it has Savargaon while on the north it has Gurewadi village.

See also
 Marathi Wikipedia Article
 Shree Hareshwar Vidyalaya
 Mandohol Dam
 Takali Dhokeshwar
 Parner
 Waphare Wadi

References 

Villages in Parner taluka
Villages in Ahmednagar district